Mangystau is a region of Kazakhstan. Its capital is Aktau (a seaport), which has a population of 183,350 (2017); the entire Mangystau Province has a population of 745,909 (2022).

Geography
The region is located in the southwest of the country, and includes Mangyshlak Peninsula. It has much of Kazakhstan's Caspian Shore. It also borders neighboring countries Turkmenistan and Uzbekistan. Mangystau also borders two other Kazakh regions (counter-clockwise), Aktobe Region and Atyrau Region. The area of the region is 165,600 square kilometers. Engineers discovered petroleum in the area in the days of the Soviet Union, drilling commenced, and much of the area was built up around the industry.

The territory of Mangystau includes varied landscapes and desert lands: Caspian lowland, plateaus (Usturt, Mangyshlak, Kendirli-Kayasan), mountains (Aktau, Karatau), cavities, desert, mountains and mountain ridges. That kind of landscape forms an original multigraded labyrinth, painted with green, yellow, pink and red sediment of loam.

Climate 
The region has a wide variety of climate conditions. North Mangystau is cold in winter due to the Ustyurt Plateau, the location of the plateau being mainly above sea level. On the whole, the climate is continental with cold winters and mild summers.

History 

The first written sources on Mangystau Region date back to the 9th century AD. According to Arabic geographers, it was uninhabited until the tenth century when groups opposing the Turkmen Oghuz settled and found sources of water and grassland. The mountain called Binkishlah (unidentified) would have marked the border between Khwarezm and the Khanate of the Khazars. These Turkmen were vassals of the Khazars, at the beginning of the thirteenth century when Yaqut al-Hamawi and Ibn al-Athir mention the name of Mankashlagh. Ibn al-Athir tells of a Turkish principality with a medina with the same name as the territory that existed from the late eleventh century. In 1097 a struggle between Kutb al-Din Muhammad, Khwarezm governor of Seljuks and Tugrul Tehghin occurred. In 1127, Atsiz occupied the whole peninsula. During Khwarezmshah rule, it was part of firstly Gorgan province, later Mazandaran Province.

In 1221, the Mongols occupied it. It was later passed to successively Golden Horde, Nogai Horde, Uzbek Khanate and Kazakh Khanate, but its population  decreased after gradual drying of the steppe and Kalmyk raids began in 1620. Some Salur and Ersari Turkmens left the region and migrated to Russia.

In 1670, Anusha Khan who was the khan of Khiva asked the Russian government to build a fortress to protect the peninsula for securing trade between Russia and Khwarezm. Puntsuk Monchak and Ayuka (1670-1724) deported most of the Cawdor and Igdir groups of Turkmenistan to the Volga basin. For protecting trade, Anusha Khan annexed it to his territories in 1676 and built a fort at the port of Karagan in 1687.

The Russians under Peter the Great sent an expedition led by the unfortunate Bekovich-Cherkassky, who established three forts on the coast of the Caspian Sea, but they were abandoned after one year. Then there were several Russian scientific expeditions. In 1834 they founded on the south coast of the Bay of Mertviy Kultuk a permanent garrison at Novo-Petrovskoye. This caused a conflict with the Khan of Khiva and an abortive military campaign between 1839 and 1840. During this period, the Bayuli tribe of the Kazakhs settled and the remaining Turkmens left it in 1840 except a group of families of the Cawdor tribe.

The peninsula was subject to conflict between Khiva and Russia; each party wanted to have the Kazakhs. In 1846, the Russians built a fort in Karagan named Novo-Petrovskoye that in 1859 was renamed Fort Alexandrovskiy. Russian domination of it began with the occupation of Krasnovodsk, located in the southern part of it in 1869. At the same time, Russians established Mangyshlak district which was subordinated to the Viceroyality of Caucasus. The Khanate of Khiva renounced possession of this peninsula in favor of the Russians in 1873. It was attached to Russia as an uyezd of Transcaspian Oblast in 1881.

The fate of the government following the 1917 revolution was in the hands of the Mensheviks. After the October Revolution the Bolsheviks prevailed but were eliminated by British intervention in June 1918. On July 12, 1918, an Interim Executive Committee, which sought to restore Alexander Kerensky, was established in Ashgabat. Bolsheviks took the region in February 1920. On August 26, 1920, the peninsula was included in the Kyrgyz Autonomous Soviet Socialist Republic within the Russian Soviet Socialist Federative Republic. On June 15, 1925, it was renamed the Kazakh Autonomous Soviet Socialist Republic, all within the Russian RFSS. On December 5, 1936, it was elevated to Kazakh SSR, but a narrow strip of the southern coastal bay fronting Kara Boghaz was ceded to Turkmen SSR at the same time.

In 1937, this peninsula became part of Gur'yev Oblast with the Kazakh part of Ustyurt Plateau, and a new department was formed with its capital Fort-Shevchenko. Its current capital was founded as Shevchenko in 1964. In 1973, the area split from Gur’yev oblast and was named Mangyshlak Oblast. This earlier version of the region was liquidated in 1988 but was restored in 1990 with the new name, Mangystau Oblast. After the independence of Kazakhstan, its capital was renamed from Shevchenko to Aktau.

Administrative divisions
The region is administratively divided into five districts and two cities of regional significance: Aktau and Zhanaozen. The districts with their populations are:

Three localities in the region - Aktau, Fort-Shevchenko, and Zhanaozen - have city or town status.

Demographics 

As of 2020, the Mangystau Region has a population of 698,796.

Ethnic groups (2020):
Kazakh: 91.22%
Russian: 5.21%
Azerbaijani: 0.90%
Others: 2.67%

Notable People from the Mangystau Region 
 Abish Kekilbayev, Kazakh and Soviet politician
 Bekzad Nurdauletov, Kazakh boxer
 Shakirat Utegaziyev, Kazakh and Soviet physician

References

External links

Official website

 
Regions of Kazakhstan